You Lift Me Up To Heaven is a compilation album from Reba McEntire released in 1992, along with Forever In Your Eyes, featuring the 1970s and early 1980s hits "(You Lift Me) Up to Heaven", "Glad I Waited Just for You", and "You're the First Time I've Thought About Leaving". This album is currently out of print.

Track listing

CD edition

Reba McEntire Vol. 1 cassette version

References

Reba McEntire albums
1992 greatest hits albums
Mercury Records compilation albums